"My Hometown" is a single by Bruce Springsteen off his Born in the U.S.A. album, that was the then-record-tying seventh and last top 10 single to come from it, peaking at #6 on the Billboard Hot 100 singles chart. It also topped the U.S. adult contemporary chart, making the song Springsteen's only #1 song on this chart to date. The song is a synthesizer-based, low-tempo number that features Springsteen on vocals.

Lyrics
The song's lyrics begin with the speaker's memories of his father instilling pride in the family's hometown. While it first appears that the song will be a nostalgic look at the speaker's childhood, the song then goes on to describe the racial violence and economic depression that the speaker witnessed as an adolescent and a young adult. The song concludes with the speaker's reluctant proclamation that he plans to move his family out of the town, but not without first taking his own son on a drive and expressing the same community pride that was instilled in him by his father.  
		 
Some of the song's images reference the recent history of Springsteen's hometown Freehold Borough, New Jersey, in particular the racial strife in 1960s New Jersey and economic tensions from the same times (such as the "textile mill being closed" was the A & M Karagheusian Rug Mill at Center and Jackson Streets of Freehold).

Reception
Cash Box called it a "tender and somber look at the real American hometown" that is "evocative in rare way."  Billboard called it a "contemplative, insightful single."

Music video
The music video for "My Hometown" was a straightforward video filming of a performance of the song at a Springsteen and E Street Band concert late in the Born in the U.S.A. Tour, eschewing fast-paced cutting for slower montages of Springsteen and various band members.  Despite its lack of visual excitement, it still managed substantial MTV airplay in late 1985 and early 1986.

Track listing
"My Hometown" - 4:33
"Santa Claus Is Comin' to Town" - 4:27

The B-side of the single, "Santa Claus Is Comin' to Town", was a semi-comical live recording of the Christmas favourite from a Springsteen and E Street Band concert on December 12, 1975, at C. W. Post College on Long Island, New York. Long familiar to Springsteen fans from its distribution years earlier to rock radio stations, it had previously been released on the fairly unknown 1981 children's album In Harmony 2; now in time for the Christmas season it was being issued again. Always a radio favorite, "Santa Claus" would benefit from the all-holiday-music-all-the-time formats of the 2000s, and during the 2005 holiday season "Santa Claus" would appear on the Billboard Top 40 Adult Recurrents and Hot Digital Songs charts.

Covers
U2 performed the song live on their 1985 The Unforgettable Fire Tour.
Cindy Kallet, Ellen Epstein & Michael Cicone performed the song on their 1993 album Only Human.
Neil Young recorded the song on his 2014 album A Letter Home.
Pavel Bobek performed the song as "Můj rodný dům" on his 1988 album Já při tom byl.
Mischief Brew, Erik Petersen recorded and digitally released the song  on Thanks, Bastards.

Personnel
According to authors Philippe Margotin and Jean-Michel Guesdon:

Bruce Springsteen – vocals, guitars
The E Street Band
Roy Bittan – keyboards
Clarence Clemons – tambourine
Danny Federici – organ
Garry Tallent – bass
Max Weinberg – drums
Ruth Jackson – backing vocals

Charts

Sales and certifications

See also 
 Death to My Hometown
 List of number-one adult contemporary singles of 1986 (U.S.)

References

External links 
 Lyrics & Audio clips from Brucespringsteen.net

Bruce Springsteen songs
1984 songs
1985 singles
Songs written by Bruce Springsteen
Song recordings produced by Jon Landau
Columbia Records singles
Rock ballads
Song recordings produced by Bruce Springsteen
Song recordings produced by Steven Van Zandt
Song recordings produced by Chuck Plotkin